Paral Ko Aago is a 1978 Nepali black-and-white film directed by Pratap Subba and produced by Cineroma. It is based on a story of the same name by the Nepali writer Guru Prasad Mainali.

Plot
A man beats his wife after getting drunk. So the wife runs away. Then the man starts seeks her and finally gets her at last. Then the film ends with the title Paral ko aago.

Cast and crew
 Tanka Sharma
 Basundhara Bhusal
 I.K. Singh
 Menuka Pradhan

Production
The film was shot in areas around Kalimpong and Darjeeling, India in 1976. Released in 1978, the black-and-white movie proved to be a great success due to its story and melodious music.

Soundtrack

The lyrics of the songs were written Manbahadur Mukhiya and Indra Thapaliya and the songs were sung by Aruna Lama, Dawa Gyalmo, Pema Lama, Shankar Gurung and Deepa Gahatraj.

Dance
Biswa Hingmang was the lead male dancer in the song “Chowbandi ko Tunama”. It was his first appearance in Nepali film. The dance was choreographed by Deodutt Thatal, a renowned dance director of Nepali cinema. In the dance group, the lead female dancers were Shanti Chhetri, Purnima Khargdha, Shanta Gurung and Sobha Chhetri. The dance was shot near Rangeet Khola at Singhla, Darjeeling.

References

External links
 IMDb

Nepalese drama films
Nepali-language films
1978 films
Films based on Nepalese novels
Nepalese black-and-white films